Holy Rus (Svyataya Rus) is a Russian Orthodox Christian organisation in Russia, headed by Ivan Otrakovsky. The organisation established an Orthodox Christian patrol squad in August 2012 in order to protect Christian churches from desecration by vandals, informing the police or stopping the criminal if necessary. In addition, the squads also deal with individuals who sneer at priests. The leader of the group, Ivan Otrakovsky, stated that: 
Holy Rus stated that its patrol squads will also target individuals insulting God or displaying sacrilegious symbols, such as an inverted cross. There are currently seven volunteer squads operating in Russia and the number is expected to grow. "Blasphemy, heresy, defilement and lechery" are offences that Holy Rus will aim to curb.

References

Religious organizations based in Russia
Neighborhood watch organizations
Christianity and society
Eastern Orthodoxy and far-right politics
Far-right politics in Russia
Russian Orthodox Church in Russia
Blasphemy